The Bajgi are a Hindu caste found in the states of Uttar Pradesh and Uttarakhand in India. They have been granted Scheduled Caste status in both these states. The Bajgi are also known as Auji, Das, Jhumarya and Dholi.

The community get their name from the Garhwali word bajana which means to play an instrument. They are said to have acquired this name on account of their traditional occupation which was to act as drummers in the courts of the temples of different village deities. The Bajgi are also called to play on special occasions such as marriages. They are found throughout Garhwal, and speak Garhwali. The Bajgi are a sub-group with the Shilpkar ethnic group of Uttarakhand. A few are also found in the adjoining districts of Uttar Pradesh such as Bijnor.

The Bajgi are still mainly employed as village musicians, with tailoring and barbering as their main subsidiary occupation. A few are employed as landless agricultural labourers. The Bajgi are Hindu, but incorporate folk beliefs such as belief in local deities such as Nirankar, Bhairab, Goril, Durga, Jakh and Nag.

The 2011 Census of India for Uttar Pradesh showed the Bajgi population as 886.

References 

Scheduled Castes of Uttarakhand
Scheduled Castes of Uttar Pradesh